The Health Education Exhibition and Resources Centre opened on 17May 1997 in Kowloon Park, Tsim Sha Tsui, Hong Kong. It is under the management of the Food and Environmental Hygiene Department of the Government of Hong Kong.

History 
The Health Education Exhibition and Resource Centre is housed in a Grade I historic building (Block S4 of the former Whitfield Barracks) in Kowloon Park. In September 1993, the former Urban Council endorsed a proposal to use the building to house an Urban Council Health Education Exhibition and Resource Centre.

Floor plan 
The centre comprises an exhibition area on two floors and an outdoor health education garden.

The exhibition on the ground floor introduce the general information of Food and Environmental Hygiene Department and then focuses on various aspects of food and environmental hygiene – high-risk foods, GM foods and food additives. The topics are thoroughly explained through computer games, videos and photos, etc.

The ground floor lecture room holds regular seminars and visitors can also enjoy a walk in the Health Education Garden while browsing the history and development of the Keep Hong Kong Clean Campaign.

There is also a souvenir counter on the ground floor.

The first floor hosts temporary exhibitions in the centre of the hall and permanent exhibitions on environmental hygiene, kitchen hygiene, public toilets and pest control.

An additional resources center is located on the second floor. The resource center boasts a collection of over 6,000 publications, a lecture room and a small conference room. It is equipped with a great variety of books and audio-visual materials.

Exhibition Content 
A permanent exhibition on the theme of "Food Safety, Environmental Hygiene and You" is staged at the centre. It features world class exhibition facilities with utilization of advanced multi-media presentation technologies.
 In the exhibition halls, you will learn more about food and environmental hygiene issues, including:
Ground Floor
 A brief introduction of the Food and Environmental Hygiene Department
 Centre for Food Safety
 Food Additives
 Food Labelling
 Genetically Modified Food
 High Risk Food
 Food Safety Plan (HACCP based)
First Floor
 Our Public Market
 Special Exhibitions
 Keep Hong Kong Clean
 Environmental Hygiene
 Pest Control
 Kitchen Hygiene
 Main Features of Public Toilet
 Cemeteries and Crematoria Services

 In the Resource Centre, you may obtain specialized information on health education, food and environmental hygiene topics. Apart from a rich collection of books and periodicals, there are also video-taped programmes, CD-ROMs and teaching packs. Full supportive facilities are provided for your comfortable viewing and studying.
 In the Lecture Room, you may attend regular seminars on interesting topics.
 In the outdoor Health Education Garden, you may enjoy a leisurely walk and our outdoor exhibits.

Activities 
The centre organises extra-curricular programmes such as school and group visits, a volunteer scheme and a health troop membership scheme.

References

External links 

Official Homepage
bc Magazine

Medical museums in Hong Kong
Science museums in Hong Kong
Grade III historic buildings in Hong Kong
Tsim Sha Tsui
Health education organizations